Lasha Khmaladze (born 20 January 1988 in Tbilisi) is a Georgian rugby union player who plays as a fly-half and fullback for the Georgia national rugby union team and Lelo in the Georgia Championship.

He currently has 29 caps for Georgia, with 3 tries scored, 15 points on aggregate. He made his debut on 11 June 2008 in an 11–3 loss to the Emerging Springboks, in Bucharest, at the IRB Nations Cup, aged 20 years old. He played in the 2011 Rugby World Cup qualifying matches and was called for the final squad. He played three games at the 2011 Rugby World Cup, one of them as a substitute, scoring a try in a 25–7 loss to Argentina on 2 October 2011.

Khmaladze has been a regular player for Georgia, playing in the side that reached their fourth Rugby World Cup qualification in a row to the 2015 Rugby World Cup in England.

References

External links

1988 births
Living people
Rugby union players from Tbilisi
Rugby union players from Georgia (country)
Batumi RC players
Rugby union centres
Georgia international rugby union players
Lelo Saracens players
The Black Lion players